The following is a list of notable individual player streaks achieved in Major League Baseball.

Hitting

Consecutive game records

Consecutive games with a hit
56 – Joe DiMaggio, New York Yankees – May 15 through July 16, 1941

Consecutive games with a home run
8 (3 tied)
Dale Long, Pittsburgh Pirates – May 19 through May 28, 1956
Don Mattingly, New York Yankees – July 8 through July 18, 1987
Ken Griffey Jr., Seattle Mariners – July 20 through July 28, 1993

Consecutive games reaching base 
84 – Ted Williams, Boston Red Sox – July 1 through September 27, 1949

Consecutive games without a strikeout
115 – Joe Sewell, Cleveland Indians – May 17 through September 19, 1929

Consecutive games with a strikeout
37 – Aaron Judge, New York Yankees – July 8 through August 21, 2017

Consecutive games with two or more hits
15 – Count Campau, St. Louis Browns – July 5 through July 23, 1890

Consecutive games with three or more hits
6 (3 tied)
Sam Thompson, Philadelphia Phillies – June 11 through 21, 1895
Jimmy Johnston, Brooklyn Dodgers – June 24 through June 30, 1923
George Brett, Kansas City Royals – May 8 through 13, 1976

Consecutive games with an RBI
17 – Ray Grimes, Chicago Cubs –  June 27 through July 23, 1922

Consecutive games scoring one or more runs
24 – Billy Hamilton, Philadelphia Phillies – July 6 through August 2, 1894

Consecutive games with a walk
22 – Roy Cullenbine, Detroit Tigers – July 2 through July 22, 1947

Consecutive games with a double
9 – Bo Bichette, Toronto Blue Jays – July 31 through August 8, 2019

Consecutive games with a triple
5 (2 tied)
Harry Davis, Pittsburgh Pirates – July 29 through August 3, 1897
Chief Wilson, Pittsburgh Pirates – June 17 through July 20, 1912

Consecutive pinch-hit appearances with a home run
3 (2 tied)
Lee Lacy, Los Angeles Dodgers – May 2, 6, and 17, 1978
Del Unser, Philadelphia Phillies – June 30, July 5 and 10, 1979

Consecutive plate appearance records

Consecutive plate appearances reaching base (unofficial) (includes all possible ways of reaching base: base hit, walk, hit-by-pitch, error, fielder's choice, dropped third strike, catcher's interference and fielder's obstruction)
17 – Earl Averill Jr., Los Angeles Angels – June 3 through June 10 (first game), 1962 (7 hits, 8 walks, 1 error, 1 fielder's choice)

Consecutive plate appearances reaching base (official) (includes all possible ways of reaching base which raise a batter's OBP: base hit, walk, hit-by-pitch)
17 – Piggy Ward, Baltimore Orioles/Cincinnati Reds – June 16 through June 19, 1893 (8 hits, 8 walks, 1 hit-by-pitch)

Consecutive plate appearances with a hit
12 (2 tied)
Johnny Kling, Chicago Cubs – August 24 through 28, 1902
Walt Dropo, Detroit Tigers – July 14 and 15, 1952

Consecutive plate appearances with a walk
7 (5 tied)
Billy Rogell, Detroit Tigers – August 17 through 19, 1938
Mel Ott, New York Giants – June 16 through 18, 1943
Eddie Stanky, New York Giants – August 29 and 30, 1950
José Canseco, Oakland Athletics – August 4 and 5, 1992
Barry Bonds, San Francisco Giants – September 24 through 26, 2004

Consecutive season records

Consecutive seasons hitting .300 or better (50 or more games)
23 – Ty Cobb, Detroit Tigers – 1906–1928

Consecutive seasons, 100 or more RBI
13 (3 tied)
Lou Gehrig, New York Yankees – 1926–1938
Jimmie Foxx, Philadelphia A's and Boston Red Sox – 1929–1941
Alex Rodriguez, Seattle Mariners, Texas Rangers and New York Yankees – 1998–2010

Consecutive seasons with 200 or more hits
10 – Ichiro Suzuki, Seattle Mariners – 2001–2010

Consecutive seasons with 150 or more hits
17 (2 tied)
Hank Aaron, Milwaukee and Atlanta Braves – 1955–1971
Derek Jeter, New York Yankees – 1996–2012

Consecutive seasons with 100 or more runs scored
13 (3 tied)
Lou Gehrig, New York Yankees – 1926–1938
Hank Aaron, Milwaukee and Atlanta Braves – 1955–1967
Alex Rodriguez, Seattle Mariners, Texas Rangers and New York Yankees – 1996–2008

Consecutive seasons with 50 or more home runs
4 - Mark McGwire, Oakland Athletics and St. Louis Cardinals - 1996–1999
4 - Sammy Sosa, Chicago Cubs - 1998–2001

Consecutive seasons with 40 or more home runs
7 – Babe Ruth, New York Yankees – 1926–1932

Consecutive seasons with 30 or more home runs
13 (2 tied)
Barry Bonds, Pittsburgh Pirates and San Francisco Giants – 1992–2004
Alex Rodriguez, Seattle Mariners, Texas Rangers and New York Yankees – 1998–2010

Consecutive seasons with 40 or more doubles
7 – Joe Medwick, St. Louis Cardinals – 1933–1939

Consecutive seasons with 20 or more triples
3 – Sam Crawford, Detroit Tigers - 1912–1914

Consecutive seasons with 100 or more walks
8 (2 tied)
Frank Thomas, Chicago White Sox – 1991 through 1998
Bobby Abreu, Philadelphia Phillies and New York Yankees – 1999–2006

Consecutive seasons with 600 or more at-bats
13 – Pete Rose, Cincinnati Reds and Philadelphia Phillies – 1968–1980

Consecutive seasons, .400 on-base percentage or better
17 – Ted Williams, Boston Red Sox – 1939–1958

Consecutive seasons, .600 slugging percentage or better (50 or more games)
7 – Barry Bonds, San Francisco Giants – 1998–2004
7 – Babe Ruth, New York Yankees – 1926–1932

Baserunning

Consecutive stolen bases without being caught stealing
50 – Vince Coleman, St. Louis Cardinals – September 18, 1988 – July 26, 1989
Consecutive games with a stolen base
12 – Bert Campaneris, Oakland Athletics – June 10, 1969 – June 21, 1969
Consecutive seasons, 100 or more stolen bases
3 – Vince Coleman, St. Louis Cardinals – 1985–1987
Consecutive seasons, 50 or more stolen bases
12 – Lou Brock, St. Louis Cardinals – 1965–1976
Consecutive seasons, 40 or more stolen bases
14 – Rickey Henderson, Oakland Athletics, New York Yankees, and Toronto Blue Jays – 1980–1993

Pitching

Consecutive game records

Consecutive games won
24 – Carl Hubbell, New York Giants – July 18, 1936 – May 27, 1937 (record set over two seasons)

Consecutive games won within a single season
19 (3 tied)
Tim Keefe, New York Giants – June 23 – August 10, 1888
Rube Marquard, New York Giants – April 11 – July 3, 1912 (streak began on Opening Day)
Gerrit Cole, Houston Astros – May 27 – October 15, 2019
Consecutive complete games  (since 1900)
39 – Jack Taylor, St. Louis Cardinals – April 15 – October 6, 1904

Consecutive games without being relieved
202 – Jack Taylor, Chicago Cubs and St. Louis Cardinals – June 20, 1901 – August 13, 1906 (187 starts, all complete games, and 15 relief appearances)

Consecutive shutouts
6 – Don Drysdale, Los Angeles Dodgers – May 14 – June 4, 1968

Consecutive no-hit games
2 – Johnny Vander Meer, Cincinnati Reds – June 11 and 15, 1938

Consecutive quality starts (six or more innings and three or fewer earned runs) (since 1920)
26 – Bob Gibson, St. Louis Cardinals – September 12, 1967 – July 30, 1968
26 - Jacob deGrom, New York Mets - May 18, 2018 - April 3, 2019
Consecutive quality starts within a single season (since 1920)

 25 - Framber Valdez, Houston Astros – April 25 – September 18, 2022

Consecutive games with 10 or more strikeouts
11 – Gerrit Cole, Houston Astros – August 7 – October 10, 2019

Consecutive saves converted
84 – Éric Gagné, Los Angeles Dodgers – August 28, 2002 – July 5, 2004 (record set over three seasons)

Consecutive team games with a save
6 (3 tied)
Éric Gagné, Los Angeles Dodgers – May 16–22, 2003
Rod Beck, Chicago Cubs – August 30 through September 5, 1998
Addison Reed, Chicago White Sox – August 16–22, 2013

Consecutive team games with a relief appearance
13 (2 tied)
Mike Marshall, Los Angeles Dodgers – June 18 through July 3, 1974
Dale Mohorcic, Texas Rangers – August 6–20, 1986

Consecutive relief appearances with one or more strikeouts
49 – Aroldis Chapman, Cincinnati Reds – August 21, 2013 through August 13, 2014 (record set over two seasons)

Consecutive relief appearances to start a season with one or more strikeouts
45 – Corey Knebel, Milwaukee Brewers – April 3, 2017 through July 15, 2017Consecutive relief appearances without allowing an earned run
43 - Zach Britton, Baltimore Orioles - May 1, 2016 through August 24, 2016

Consecutive innings records

Consecutive scoreless innings pitched
59 – Orel Hershiser, Los Angeles Dodgers – August 30, 1988 through September 28, 1988. (does not include 8 scoreless innings pitched in Game 1 of the 1988 NLCS or 2/3 scoreless innings pitched on April 5, 1989 to open the next season)Consecutive hitless innings pitched
25.1 – Cy Young, Boston Americans – April 25 through May 11, 1904 (included one perfect game)Consecutive perfect innings pitched
15.1 – Yusmeiro Petit, San Francisco Giants – July 22 through August 28, 2014 (as starting and relief pitcher over 8 games, 1st and 8th games as starting pitcher and 2nd through 7th games as a relief pitcher)15.0 – Mark Buehrle, Chicago White Sox – July 18–28, 2009 (as starting pitcher, included one perfect game)Consecutive innings pitched with a strikeout
73 – Gerrit Cole, Houston Astros – August 7 through October 10, 2019

Consecutive innings pitched without allowing a walk
84.1 – Bill Fischer, Kansas City Athletics – August 3 through September 30, 1962

Consecutive innings pitched without allowing a home run (modern era)
269.1 – Greg Minton, San Francisco Giants – June 1, 1979 through May 1, 1982

Consecutive innings pitched without allowing a home run (dead-ball era)
1001 – Ed Killian, Cleveland Indians and Detroit Tigers – September 19, 1903, through August 7, 1907

Consecutive batters faced with a strikeout
10 (4 tied)
Tom Seaver, New York Mets – April 22, 1970 (as a starting pitcher)Éric Gagné, Los Angeles Dodgers – May 17–21, 2003 (as a relief pitcher)Aaron Nola, Philadelphia Phillies – June 25, 2021
Corbin Burnes, Milwaukee Brewers – August 11, 2021

Consecutive strikes thrown (since pitch-by-pitch record keeping was introduced in 1988; includes foul balls and balls-in-play)38 – Bartolo Colón, Oakland Athletics – April 18, 2012

Consecutive strikes thrown to start a game(since 1988)24 – George Kirby, Seattle Mariners – August 24, 2022

Consecutive scoreless innings pitched to start a major league career
39 – Brad Ziegler, Oakland Athletics – May 31 through August 14, 2008

Consecutive season records

Consecutive seasons, 30 or more wins
6 – Tim Keefe, New York Metropolitans (American Association) and New York Giants 1883–1888

Consecutive seasons, 20 or more wins
12 – Christy Mathewson, New York Giants – 1903–1914

Consecutive seasons, 10 or more wins
20 – Greg Maddux, Chicago Cubs, Atlanta Braves, Los Angeles Dodgers, and San Diego Padres – 1988–2007 (includes a streak of 17 seasons with 15 or more wins, also a record)Consecutive seasons, 300 or more strikeouts
5 – Randy Johnson, Seattle Mariners, Houston Astros, and Arizona Diamondbacks – 1998–2002

Consecutive seasons, 200 or more strikeouts
9 – Tom Seaver, New York Mets – 1968–1976

Consecutive seasons winning Triple Crown (lowest ERA, most wins, and most strikeouts in league - starting pitchers only)2 - (4 tied)
 - Grover Cleveland Alexander, Philadelphia Phillies (National League) - 1915–1916
 - Lefty Grove, Philadelphia Athletics (American League) - 1930–1931 (led both leagues in both seasons) - Sandy Koufax, Los Angeles Dodgers (National League) - 1965–1966 (led both leagues in both seasons) - Roger Clemens, Toronto Blue Jays (American League) - 1997–1998

Consecutive Opening Day starts
14 – Jack Morris, Detroit Tigers, Minnesota Twins, and Toronto Blue Jays – 1980–1993

Consecutive seasons, 50 or more saves
 2 (2 tied)
 Éric Gagné, Los Angeles Dodgers - 2002–2003
 Jim Johnson, Baltimore Orioles - 2012–2013

Consecutive seasons, 40 or more saves
4 – (3 tied)
Trevor Hoffman (twice), San Diego Padres – 1998–2001 and 2004–2007
Francisco Rodríguez, Los Angeles Angels of Anaheim – 2005–2008
Craig Kimbrel, Atlanta Braves – 2011–2014

Consecutive seasons, 30 or more saves
9 – Mariano Rivera, New York Yankees – 2003–2011

 Fielding 
The nature and demands of each position differ significantly, thus the records are separated by position.  The streaks listed below are only relative to a player's fielding chances while playing the listed position.  Errors made at other positions would not disrupt the streak listed.

Consecutive fielding chances at each position without an error 
First base – 2,379 – Casey Kotchman, Los Angeles Angels of Anaheim / Atlanta Braves / Boston Red Sox / Seattle Mariners – June 20, 2008, through August 21, 2010
Second base – 911 – Plácido Polanco, Detroit Tigers / Philadelphia Phillies – July 1, 2006, through April 7, 2008
Shortstop – 544 – Mike Bordick, Baltimore Orioles / Toronto Blue Jays – April 10, 2002, through April 2, 2003
Third base – 272 – Vinny Castilla, Colorado Rockies / Washington Nationals – July 4, 2004, through April 22, 2005
Outfield – 938 – Darren Lewis, Oakland Athletics / San Francisco Giants – August 21 – October 3, 1990 / July 13, 1991, through June 29, 1994
Catcher – 1,565 – Mike Matheny, St. Louis Cardinals – August 1, 2002, through August 4, 2004 (does not include passed balls)Pitcher – 273 – Claude Passeau, Chicago Cubs – September 21, 1941, through May 20, 1946

Source for figures through 2007: The Elias Book of Baseball Records, 2008.

 Games played 

Consecutive games played
2,632 – Cal Ripken Jr., Baltimore Orioles – May 30, 1982 through September 19, 1998

Consecutive innings played (non-pitcher)
8,243 – Cal Ripken Jr., Baltimore Orioles – June 5, 1982 through September 14, 1987 (record set over 903 games)Consecutive seasons played
27 – Cap Anson, Rockford Forest Citys, Philadelphia Athletics, Chicago White Stockings, and Chicago Colts – 1871–1897 (1871–1875 seasons were played in the National Association, a professional league which preceded Major League Baseball).26 – Nolan Ryan, New York Mets, California Angels, Houston Astros, and Texas Rangers – 1968–1993 (all seasons played in Major League Baseball)Consecutive seasons played with one team
23 (2 tied)
Brooks Robinson, Baltimore Orioles – 1955–1977
Carl Yastrzemski, Boston Red Sox – 1961–1983

Consecutive seasons played with different or multiple teams (includes off-season and mid-season changes)12 – Terry Mulholland, Philadelphia Phillies, New York Yankees, San Francisco Giants, Seattle Mariners, Chicago Cubs, Atlanta Braves, Pittsburgh Pirates, Los Angeles Dodgers, Cleveland Indians, and Minnesota Twins  – 1993–2004

Consecutive seasons with a playoff appearance
 13 – Mariano Rivera, New York Yankees – 1995–2007

 Awards 
Consecutive MVP Awards
4 – Barry Bonds, San Francisco Giants – 2001–2004

Consecutive Cy Young Awards
4 (2 tied)
Greg Maddux, Chicago Cubs and Atlanta Braves – 1992–1995
Randy Johnson, Arizona Diamondbacks – 1999–2002

Consecutive Gold Glove Awards
16 (2 tied)
Brooks Robinson, Baltimore Orioles – 1960–1975
Jim Kaat, Minnesota Twins, Chicago White Sox, and Philadelphia Phillies – 1962–1977

Consecutive Silver Slugger Awards(award first attributed in 1980)10 – Mike Piazza, Los Angeles Dodgers and New York Mets – 1993–2002

Consecutive Hank Aaron Awards(award first attributed in 1999; fan voting first included in 2003)3 – Alex Rodriguez, Texas Rangers – 2001–2003

Consecutive Edgar Martínez Awards (award first attributed in 1973, originally called the Outstanding Designated Hitter Award) 5 – David Ortiz, Boston Red Sox – 2003–2007

Consecutive Rolaids Relief Man of the Year Awards(award first attributed in 1976, discontinued after 2012) 4 – Dan Quisenberry, Kansas City Royals – 1982–1985

Consecutive MLB Player of the Month Awards (award first attributed in 1958) 3 – Mark McGwire, St. Louis Cardinals – September, 1997 through May, 1998

Consecutive MLB Pitcher of the Month Awards (award first attributed in 1975)3 (3 tied)
Pedro Martínez, Boston Red Sox – April–June, 1999
Johan Santana, Minnesota Twins – July–September, 2004
Jake Arrieta, Chicago Cubs - August, 2015 through April, 2016

Consecutive MLB Rookie of the Month Awards (award first attributed in 2001) 4 – Mike Trout, Los Angeles Angels of Anaheim – May–August, 2012

Consecutive All-Star Game appearances
25 – Hank Aaron, Milwaukee / Atlanta Braves, Milwaukee Brewers – 1955–1975 (two games were played from 1959–1962'')

References

External links 
 Baseball's 11 greatest individual streaks in major league history

Individual Streaks
Individual Streaks